Marcelo Alejandro Escudero (born 25 July 1972 in Punta Alta) is a retired Argentine football midfielder.

Escudero started his career with Sporting Punta Alta in the South Bahia Blanca regional League of Argentine football. Shortly afterwards, he was transferred to  Newell's Old Boys in 1992. He made his professional debut in the Argentine First Division with Newell's, where he was part of the squad that won the Clausura 1992 championship.

In 1995 Escudero was selected to join the Argentina squad for the Copa América in 1995.

In 1996, he joined River Plate where he won five league championships, as well as the Copa Libertadores in 1996, and the Supercopa Sudamericana in 1997.

In 2003, he had an unsuccessful spell with Fortaleza in Brazil. His last club was Olimpo de Bahía Blanca where he retired in 2005.

Honours
 Newell's Old Boys
Primera División Argentina: Clausura 1992

 River Plate
Primera División Argentina: Apertura 1996, Clausura 1997, Apertura 1999, Clausura 2000, Clausura 2002
Copa Libertadores: 1996
Supercopa Sudamericana: 1997

External links

 Argentine Primera statistics

1972 births
Living people
Sportspeople from Buenos Aires Province
Argentine footballers
Association football midfielders
Newell's Old Boys footballers
Club Atlético River Plate footballers
Fortaleza Esporte Clube players
Olimpo footballers
Argentine Primera División players
Argentina international footballers
Argentine expatriate footballers
Expatriate footballers in Brazil
Argentine expatriate sportspeople in Brazil
1995 Copa América players